Sodium germanate is an inorganic compound with the formula Na2GeO3. It is a colorless solid. Sodium germanate is primarily used for the synthesis of other germanium compounds.

Preparation and reactions
Sodium germanate can be prepared by the fusion of germanium oxide with sodium hydroxide at high temperatures:
2NaOH  +  GeO2  →  Na2GeO3  +  H2O
An intermediate in this reaction is the protonated derivative NaHGeO3, which is a water-soluble salt.

Structure

it is structurally analogous to sodium metasilicate, Na2SiO3, consisting of polymeric GeO32− anions made up of vertex sharing {GeO4} tetrahedra.

See also
 Germanate

References

Germanates
Sodium compounds